is a Japanese multimedia project developed by Kadokawa's B's Log Comic magazine with collaboration by Lawson. The project started in 2015 and has already released mooks and bundles with drama CDs. It centers around a group of male high school students who always stop at a convenience store on their way home from school. An anime television series adaptation animated by Pierrot and directed by Hayato Date aired from July 6 to September 28, 2017 on TBS.

Synopsis
The series tells the story of the boys falling in love and follows each of the students on their every day journey as they explore the sentiments and feelings of love right up until the moment they confess it to their chosen ones.

Characters

Male characters

Haruki is a high school freshman and swimming club member. In kindergarten, a girl read him a fairy tale and gave him the book. Haruki later found out the girl is Mashiki Misora, the twin sister of Mashiki Miharu. But, he still falls in love with Miharu. He reunited with Miharu at the convenience store near the high school.

An easy going friend of Haruki, Towa is a high school freshman who joined the soccer club who often sleeps over at Haruki's house. He becomes interested in his class representative, Mami Mihashi, after finding out she likes cute things and shojo manga, just like him.

 The student council president in love with his step-sister Waka Kisaki.

 He is in the cooking society and a talented chef.

 He is in the Track & Field Club and loves running more than anything else.

 The student council vice-president who is a good friend of Mikado Nakajima.

Female characters

 She is in love with Haruki Mishima. She has a very weak heart. Her twin sister, Misora, who died when she was little from the same disease.

The class representative in Towa's class. She likes to read shojo manga and is into cute things, but keep it a secret because she thinks it doesn't fit her. Lives in a very strict household.

 The step-sister of Mikado Nakajima.

 She is in the cooking society.

 She is in the library committee and in love with Natsu Asumi.

Media

Anime
An anime television series adaptation was announced on April 19, 2017 via the project's official Twitter account and premiered on TBS and other networks starting from July 6 to September 28, 2017. The anime is directed by Hayato Date at Pierrot. Satomi Ishikawa adapted Makoto Senzaki's original character designs into animation and Sayaka Harada is in charge of series composition. The opening theme titled "Stand Up Now" is performed by Cellchrome while the ending theme titled  is performed by ORANGE POST REASON. In addition to TBS, the show aired on BS-TBS and CS-TBS Channel 1. Crunchyroll garnered the streaming rights for worldwide viewing and Funimation licensed the series in North America for an English dub and home video release in August 2018.

Episode list

Reception

Previews
The anime series' first episode garnered a generally poor reception from Anime News Network's staff during the Summer 2017 season previews. Theron Martin criticized Hayato Date's direction for having long and uninspired shots, the multiple romantic storylines lacking a distinct charm and interesting characters, and Studio Pierrot's animation adding into the overall blandness. James Beckett saw it as a "run-of-the-mill teen romance", noting the mundane moments being performed by "blandly pleasant" characters with non-existent chemistry to viewers except the author writing them. Paul Jensen said that both the relationship dynamics and comedy concepts looked good on paper but were hampered by "stiff and clumsy" writing, off-beat presentation, and lifeless animation. Rebecca Silverman commended the "pleasant simplicity" of the character designs and "sufficiently catchy" theme songs but felt the main cast were "blandly appealing" and the overall tone to be "slightly dull." Jacob Chapman found the episode to be "uninspired and boring", criticizing the production, soundtrack, story and characters for lacking any "spark of life or originality", saying "it's an easy skip for all but the most diehard fans of milquetoast romance." Conversely, Nick Creamer appreciated the anthology format and slice-of-life pacing to the initial romances but felt were undermined by the lackluster art direction and presentation, calling the overall episode "perfectly functional."

Series reception
Allen Moody, writing for THEM Anime Reviews, gave credit to the "attractive and finely-detailed" character art and the Cellchrome opening but was critical of the four main characters and their respective relationships, the unmemorable supporting cast and Rie Kugimiya's performance as Mami, concluding that: "It's a going-through-the-motions romantic drama with two male leads who BOTH make you want to beat some sense into them with a baseball bat, and two girls without much fire or spirit in their souls at all." Jensen reviewed the complete anime series in 2018. He found neither of the four main leads nor their relationships interesting to grab viewers attention, the supporting cast underutilized, production values adequate at best, and felt the series was aimless towards both the teen romantic drama and slice-of-life crowds, concluding that: "[I]n a medium that tends to go after single, narrow demographics, something as unfocused as Convenience Store Boy Friends seems unlikely to find much of an audience. Whatever you're looking for, this show probably isn't your best option."

References

External links
 
Anime official website 

2015 Japanese novels
2017 anime television series debuts
Crunchyroll anime
Funimation
Light novels
Pierrot (company)
Romance anime and manga
Slice of life anime and manga
TBS Television (Japan) original programming